Cross Currents is the third studio album by Brazilian jazz pianist Eliane Elias. The record was released via Denon Records Blue Note label.

Reception
Scott Yanow of Allmusic stated "Pianist Eliane Elias' second of two Denon CDs recorded before she hooked up with Blue Note is a lesser-known but worthy session. Elias is mostly featured in a trio with bassist Eddie Gomez and drummer Jack DeJohnette performing originals, a pair of Charles Mingus compositions ("Peggy's Blue Skylight" and "East Coasting"), "Beautiful Love," "When You Wish Upon a Star" and Bud Powell's "Hallucinations." Elias was quickly developing into a strong modern mainstream pianist. The concluding number ("Coming and Going") was written by her grandmother in 1927 at age 12 and features Elias with Gomez, drummer Peter Erskine, guitarist Barry Finnerty, percussionist Cafe and nine singers (including a few family members). Well worth searching for." A reviewer of Dusty Groove added "Lovely work from Eliane Elias – and exactly the set you should turn to if you ever doubted her chops on the piano! Elias starts with a quick rendition of Bud Powell's "Hallucinations", played with a deftness that Toshiko Akiyoshi would appreciate – and the set then runs into a batch of tunes that includes some charming originals from Eliane – those fully formed numbers that always made her a well-rounded talent right from the start! The blend of sensitivity and swing on the record is really impressive".

Track listing

Selected personnel
Band
Eliane Elias – piano, producing
Barry Finnerty – acoustic guitar
Eddie Gómez – bass
Jack DeJohnette – drums (except tracks 2, 5, and 6)
Café – percussion (track 2)
Peter Erskine – drums (tracks 2, 5, and 6)
Production
Malcolm Pollack – recording engineer
Randy Brecker – producer
Christine Martin – executive producer

Chart performance
Cross Currents peaked at #1  on the Jazz chart of the Gavin Report.

Notes
The song "Coming And Going (Vou Alí E Já Volto)" was written by Eliane's grandmother in 1927 when she was 12 years old. 
Eliane Elias plays Steinway & Sons pianos.

References

External links

1987 albums
Eliane Elias albums
Blue Note Records albums